This is a list of villages in Lalganj block, Vaishali district, Bihar state, India.

See also

List of villages in Vaishali district
PIYA

References

Lists of villages in Vaishali district
Lalganj